Annibal Napoleão dos Santos (3 January 1845 or 1846 — 1880) was a Portuguese pianist and composer. He was the second of three Napoleão siblings, the elder being Arthur Napoleão (1843–1925), the younger Alfredo Napoleão (1852–1917). Annibal is the least important among them, partly because of his weak health and partly of his premature death.

Biography
He was born in Porto, Portugal to Alexandre Napoleão (a musician himself) and Joaquina Maria dos Santos. First studied music with his father, then with Sproule in Ireland. He became a professor in Lisbon. In 1869 moved to Brasil, toured the country and gave musical lessons in Rio de Janeiro. But the Brazilian climate did not fit him well, and he came back to Portugal, where he died in Lisbon in 1880.

Compositions 
Annibal's compositions were published by his brother Arthur in Rio de Janeiro.
For piano
Op.1 - Le Gladiateur, Grande galop de bravoure
Op.2 - Les Perles d'Andalousie, Six danses caractéristiques
Op.3 - La Pluie de roses (A chuva de rozas), Grande polka de concert No. 1
Op.4 - Rêve du jeune âge, Nocturne No. 1
Op.5 - Impromptu-Valse
Op.6 - Ernani, Transcription de concert
Op.7 - Il Arco di Sant'Anna, Opera de Sá Noronha, Fantaisie-caprice (Fantaisie de salon)
Op.10 - Dans les forêts du Brésil, Souvenir de voyage, Impromptu
Op.11 - Souvenir, Nocturne No. 2
Op.12 - Inquiétude, Idylle
Op.13 - Vision d'amour, Nocturne No. 3
Op.14 - Tourbillon de fleurs, Grande polka de concert No. 2
Op.15 - Je t'aime, Romance sans paroles
Op.16 - Minuit, Impromptu No. 2
Op.17 - La Douleur, Romance sans paroles
Op.18 - Giroflé-Girofla, Fantaisie
Op.19 - Les soupirs, Mazurka élégante
Op.20 - Patrie!, Suite de Valses
Op.21 - Rêverie
For voice and piano
 Saudades, Romance, text by Fernando Castico

References

External links

1880 deaths
Brazilian composers
Musicians from Porto
Brazilian pianists
19th-century Portuguese people
19th-century pianists
Year of birth uncertain